Posht Lor (also Romanized as Posht-e Lor) is a village in Halil Rural District, in the Central District of Jiroft County, Kerman Province, Iran. At the 2006 census, its population was 992, in 235 families.

References 

Populated places in Jiroft County